St. Francis Xavier High School is a high school in west Edmonton, Alberta, Canada.  It is operated by Edmonton Catholic Schools System. The school started in 1955, with the purpose built school (since expanded) opened in 1958. Originally part of the Town of Jasper Place school system, St. Francis Xavier transferred to the Edmonton system when Jasper Place amalgamated with Edmonton in 1964.

Academic program

In addition to the regular Alberta high school curriculum, the school offers a number of specialized programs.

The advanced placement program "prepare[s] students to acquire the knowledge, concepts, and skills needed to engage in a higher level of learning".

The school provides a number of sports academies programs: baseball, golf, hockey, lacrosse and soccer.  These programs are committed to development of the student as an athlete and give the student the opportunity to develop athletic skills balanced with academic studies.

Notable alumni
Asmir Begović - current (2017–18 Premier League season) Premier League professional association football player, member Bosnia and Herzegovina national team
Mark Carney - former Governor of the Bank of England and Bank of Canada
Kevin Connauton - current (2017–18 NHL season) NHL professional ice hockey player
Tyler Ennis - current (2017–18 NHL season) NHL player
Paula Findlay - retired triathlete and multi-gold medalist in ITU World Triathlon Series
Dave Hoyda - former ( 2015) retired NHL player
Dustin Kohn - retired NHL player
Mark Messier - retired NHL player and Hockey Hall of Famer
Paul Messier - retired NHL player 
Tosaint Ricketts - current (2019 MLS season) Major League Soccer professional player, member Canada men's national soccer team
Jared Spurgeon - current (2017–18 NHL season) NHL hockey player
Chris Stachniak - retired NLL professional lacrosse player, retired NLL coach

References

External links
 St. Francis Xavier High School web page

High schools in Edmonton
Catholic secondary schools in Alberta
Educational institutions established in 1955
1955 establishments in Alberta